The 1903–04 Scottish Division Two was won by Hamilton Academical, with Ayr Parkhouse finishing bottom.

Table

References 

 Scottish Football Archive

Scottish Division Two seasons
2